Season of Glass is the debut extended play (EP) by South Korean girl group GFriend. It was released by Source Music on January 15, 2015 and distributed by KT Music. The album contains three songs, including the single "Glass Bead", and two instrumental tracks. The album peaked at number nine on the Gaon Album Chart and has sold over 10,000 units. GFriend promoted the album with a series of televised live performances on South Korea's music shows. Their debut was often compared to Girls' Generation's debut, with the music and choreography of "Glass Bead" being reminiscent of "Into the New World".

Release and promotion
In November 2014, Source Music announced the upcoming debut of their first girl group, named GFriend. On January 5, the whole group was unveiled and their album release date was announced. GFriend's debut EP (also called a mini album) was released as a digital download on January 15, and was released in CD format the next day. The music video for lead single "Glass Bead" was produced by Zanybros and directed by Hong Won-ki. GFriend was designed to target a teenage audience, and the music video is set in various school locations, including a classroom and gym. "Glass Bead" is the first song in the group's "school series" and represents the start of school semester and enjoying time with friends.

GFriend promoted the album with performances of "Glass Bead" on various music shows, starting with Music Bank on January 16. They presented an "innocent and youthful" image, wearing cheerleader-inspired outfits with simple hairstyles and minimal makeup. In contrast to their appearance, the group's choreography was described as "powerful" and "energetic".

Production and composition
The album's intro track, "Glass Bead", and "White" were written by Iggy and Seo Yong-bae, who had previously written songs such as Ailee's "Heaven" and Orange Caramel's "Catallena". Seo is an in-house producer at Rainbow Bridge World. "Neverland" was composed by Yoon Woo-seok of ZigZag Note and Kang Myeong-shin, with lyrics by Kim Seo-jun and Kim Yong-hwan (Eden Beatz).

"Glass Bead" is bubblegum pop dance song, with a "magnificent string sound, powerful beat, and
emotional and flowing melody". The lyrics are from the perspective of a teenage girl, who says she will not easily break despite seeming fragile like a glass bead, and will shine for the one she loves. Originally, a different, "softer", song was set to be the album's single. When GFriend's manager played "Glass Bead" for the group, they all instantly liked it. Sowon said it "gives the feel of running around at the gym, which I thought matched us better". Although the song was often compared to Girls' Generation's "Into the New World", it reminded the group of Fin.K.L and S.E.S., Korean girl groups from the late 1990s and early 2000s. "Neverland" is a dance song with "powerful" synths and guitars, featuring vocal harmony in the chorus, and "White" is a medium-tempo dance song reminiscent of the 1990s.

Reception
The album entered the weekly Gaon Album Chart at number twelve, and peaked at number nine in the second week of February. It was the 38th best selling album during the month of January, selling 1,146 physical copies. As of June 2016, it has sold a total of 11,640 units. "Glass Bead" entered the Gaon Digital Chart at number 89 and peaked at number 25 the following week. The song's music video was the ninth most viewed K-pop music video globally during the month of January.

At the end of January, GFriend was included in Billboards list of "Top 5 K-Pop Artists to Watch in 2015". Jeff Benjamin said that GFriend, along with fellow rookie girl group Lovelyz, was "leading a new wave of female acts with a classic innocent look", in contrast to the popular "sexy" trend of 2014. He said the "sweet sound" and "non-stop" choreography of "Glass Bead" brought "undeniable nostalgia" for Girl's Generation's debut single, "Into the New World". Writing for Fuse, he said GFriend was "arguably the most successful" innocent girl group and called "Glass Bead" a "nostalgic gem". He concluded that the group needed to create a unique identity for themselves, or "risk being nothing but a [Girl's Generation] tribute act".

Track listing

Personnel
Credits adapted from album liner notes.

Locations

 Recorded at K-Note Studio
 Recorded at Hong Sound 
 Recorded at Big Hit Studio 
 Mixed at Cube Studio
 Mastered at Suono Mastering

Personnel

 GFriend - backing vocals 
 Seo Yong-bae - drum programming 
 Iggy - piano , electric piano , synthesizer 
 Kwon Seok-hong - string arrangement 
 Kim So-ri - backing vocals 
 Jung Jae-pil - guitar 
 Yoong strings - strings 
 Kim Gi-wook - bass 
 No Eun-jong - guitar

Charts

Sales and certifications

See also

References

External links
 Album highlight medley on YouTube
 "Glass Bead" on YouTube

2015 debut EPs
Genie Music EPs
Korean-language EPs
GFriend EPs
Hybe Corporation EPs